Icuk Sugiarto (born 4 October 1962) is an Indonesian former badminton player.

Career 
Largely a speed and power player, Sugiarto won the gold medal at the 1983 IBF World Championships, upsetting fellow countryman Liem Swie King in the final, and the bronze medal at the 1987 and 1989 IBF World Championships. He captured singles titles at the Indonesia (1982, 1986, 1988), Malaysia (1984), Thailand (1984, 1985), French (1988), and Hong Kong (1988) Opens; at the Badminton World Cup (1985, 1986); and at the Southeast Asian Games (three consecutive times) in 1985, 1987, and 1989. At nineteen, he shared the 1982 Asian Games men's doubles title with doubles maestro Christian Hadinata. Sugiarto was a member of Indonesia's world champion Thomas Cup (men's international) team of 1984.

Icuk is well known for his rally game, with accurate lobs and dropshots that unsettling and quite exhausting for his opponents, relying on his over average fitness and defense.

Personal life 
He's married Nina Yaroh in 1983 and they have three children, Natassia Octaviani (1984), Tommy (1988), and Jauza (1999). Tommy and Jauza are also badminton players, while Jauza is still in junior, Tommy now is an elite men's singles player.

Achievements

Olympic Games (exhibition) 
Men's singles

World Championships 
Men's singles

World Cup 
Men's singles

Asian Games 
Men's doubles

Mixed doubles

Southeast Asian Games 
Men's singles

International Open Tournaments (11 titles, 8 runners-up)
The World Badminton Grand Prix has been sanctioned by the International Badminton Federation from 1983 to 2006.

Men's singles

 IBF Grand Prix tournament

External links
BWF Profile

1962 births
Living people
People from Surakarta
Indonesian male badminton players
Badminton players at the 1988 Summer Olympics
Badminton players at the 1982 Asian Games
Badminton players at the 1986 Asian Games
Asian Games gold medalists for Indonesia
Asian Games silver medalists for Indonesia
Asian Games bronze medalists for Indonesia
Asian Games medalists in badminton
Medalists at the 1982 Asian Games
Medalists at the 1986 Asian Games
Competitors at the 1985 Southeast Asian Games
Competitors at the 1987 Southeast Asian Games
Competitors at the 1989 Southeast Asian Games
Southeast Asian Games gold medalists for Indonesia
Southeast Asian Games silver medalists for Indonesia
Southeast Asian Games medalists in badminton
21st-century Indonesian people
20th-century Indonesian people